Daniel Hill or Dan Hill may refer to:

 Daniel Harvey Hill (18211889), American Confederate general in the Civil War
 Daniel Harvey Hill Jr. (18591924), American educator and the third chancellor of North Carolina State University, son of Daniel Harvey Hill
 Dan Hill (American football) (19171989), American football player
 Daniel G. Hill (19232003), Canadian sociologist, civil servant, human rights specialist and Black Canadian historian
 Dan Hill (Daniel Grafton "Dan" Hill IV, born 1954), Canadian singer/songwriter
 Dan Hill (1975 album), the 1975 album by Dan Hill
 Dan Hill (1987 album), the 1987 album by Dan Hill
 Daniel Hill (actor) (born 1956), British actor
 Dan Hill (rugby league) (born 2002), British rugby player

See also 
 Daniel's Hill Historic District, a national historic district located in Lynchburg, Virginia
 Dan's Hill, a historic home located near Danville in Pittsylvania County, Virginia
 Danny Hill (disambiguation)